State Route 530 (SR 530) is a nearly  long, east-west state highway in the southeastern corner of the U.S. state of Ohio. The western terminus of State Route 530 is at a signalized T-intersection with State Route 60 in downtown Lowell.

Established in the late 1930s, State Route 530 exists entirely within Washington County, passing through rural northern portions of the county while connecting the Lowell with the Lower Salem vicinity.

Route description
All of State Route 530 is situated within the northern part of Washington County.  The highway is not included as a component of the National Highway System.

History
The designation of State Route 530 took place in 1937.  From its inception, State Route 530 has been routed along the same alignment that it utilizes today.  No major changes have taken place to the routing of State Route 530 since it was established.

Major intersections

References

530
Transportation in Washington County, Ohio